Gotha (German: Landkreis Gotha) is a Kreis (district) in western central Thuringia, Germany. Neighboring districts are Unstrut-Hainich-Kreis, Sömmerda, the Kreis-free city Erfurt, Ilm-Kreis, Schmalkalden-Meiningen and the Wartburgkreis.

Geography
Gotha borders the Thuringian Basin in the north and east, with a low point of about 200 meters (656 feet) in the northern part of the district. Fahner Heights, a muschelkalk ridge with a height of 413 meters (1,355 feet), is located in the extreme north, between the municipalities of Tonna and Bienstädt.

The land rises to about 900 meters (2,953 feet) in the Thuringian Forest, which covers the south-western area of the district. The Rennsteig hiking trail follows a ridge line through the forest. The highest point in the district is Großer Inselsberg at 916.5 m (3,007 ft), on the border with Schmalkalden-Meiningen. The southern area of the district also has 3 dams: the Ohra Dam near the village of Luisenthal, as well as the Tambach-Dietharz Dam and the Schmalwasser Dam, both in the catchment area of the Apfelstädt, near the town of Tambach-Dietharz.

On the southeastern boundary of the district, between Ohrdruf and Mühlberg, is the muschelkalk Ohrdrufer Plateau which sits at an average of about 450 meters (1,436 ft). Since 1906, 49.5 km2 of this plateau has been used as military proving ground.

Aside from the areas covered by the Thuringian forest and other small wooded ridges, the district is largely used for agriculture.

History

Administrative

In 1640, Gotha was partitioned from the Saxon Duchy of Saxe-Weimar to form the Duchy of Saxe-Gotha in the Holy Roman Empire. After acquiring additional territory from nearby dutchies, Saxe-Gotha was itself partitioned into seven dutchies in 1680, with the Gotha territory continuing in Saxe-Gotha-Altenburg. The duchy's ruling family line went extinct in 1825 with the death of Frederick IV, and the territory was divided again, this time into Saxe-Hildburghausen and Saxe-Coburg and Gotha. With the abolishment of the Monarchy of Germany following the November Revolution, the territory of Coburg was merged into Bavaria, and Gotha became part of Thuringia.

The Weimar district of Gotha was formed on October 1, 1922, from the largest parts of the cities and surrounding district offices of Gotha, Ohrdruf, and Waltershausen. The city of Gotha was made the district capital. This merged district extended south to Oberhof.

During the Nazi regime, municipal self-government ended abruptly in 1933. After the Second World War, both the US and later Soviet military government reinstated the administrative structures from the Weimar period, with some municipal additions and removals happening in 1946. In 1949, Gotha was integrated into East Germany, undergoing further territorial changes in 1950 and during the administrative reform of 1952.

In May 1990, the first free municipal elections since 1946 took place in Thuringia, with Thuringia being re-established as a free state later in October of that year. Local government was officially granted power by Thuringia in 1993, in the form of district councils and district administrators. The most recent territorial change for the district was in 1994, where it gained several towns from surrounding former East German districts.

In 2009, the Nesse-Apfelstädt-Gemeinden Verwaltungsgemeinschaft ("collective municipality") was disbanded.

Population 

Data Source: Thuringian State Office for Statistics

Directors, Chairmen, and Administrators of the District

Partnerships
Since 1990 the district has a partnership with the district Main-Kinzig in Hessen, Germany.

Coat of arms
The coat of arms shows Friedenstein Castle in the top, the largest Baroque building located in the city of Gotha. The wavy line below symbolizes the Leina canal, which was built 1366 to 1369 from Schönau to Gotha, to bring water into the city. The star at the bottom was the symbol of the Duchy of Saxe-Gotha-Altenburg.

The coat of arms was granted 28 June 1991.

Towns and municipalities

{|
|-----
!Verwaltungsgemeinschaft-free towns
!colspan=2|and municipalities
|-
|valign=top|
Friedrichroda
Gotha
Ohrdruf
Tambach-Dietharz
Waltershausen
|valign=top|
Bad Tabarz
Drei Gleichen
Emleben
Georgenthal
Herrenhof
Hörsel
|valign=top|
Luisenthal
Nesse-Apfelstädt
Nessetal
Schwabhausen
Sonneborn
|}

See also
 Saxe-Gotha
 Saxe-Coburg-Gotha

References

External links

 Official website (German)

 
Districts of Thuringia